The men's javelin throw event at the 2007 Summer Universiade was held on 9–11 August.

Medalists

Results

Qualification
Qualification: 76.00 m (Q) or at least 12 best (q) qualified for the final.

Final

References
Results
Final results

Javelin
2007